Fauji Foundation, lit. Soldier Foundation), (also known as Fauji Group) is a Pakistani conglomerates company which is active in fertilizer, cement, food, power generation, gas exploration, LPG marketing and distribution, financial services, and security services. The word "Fauji" is an Urdu word that means "soldier" and the company was set up in order to provide employment opportunities to Pakistani ex-military personnel and to generate funds for the welfare of widows, and families of martyrs.

History
Fauji Foundation was established as a charitable trust in 1954, and operating on a completely self-sustaining basis, channels approximately 80% of the profits from commercial ventures into social protection programs that serve a beneficiary population representing approximately 7% of the country's population.
 
Spending more than Rs. 23.8 billion since inception on welfare, the Foundation provides services in the areas of healthcare, education, educational stipends, technical and vocational training.

Between 2011 and 2015, the foundation assets grew 78 percent.

A 2017 study found that 33 of a group of 141 former Pakistan Armed Forces corps commanders, or 23.4%, were given jobs by the Foundation after their retirement from the military. At any one time, as many as seven former corps commanders serve as either the managing directors of the Fauji Foundation or the Army Welfare Trust or as managing directors of subsidiaries with personnel in these positions rotated out every three years. The study says the Foundation plays a valuable role in preventing retired senior officers from intervening in the activities of serving officers and from entering electoral politics.

Holding entities

Fully owned
 Fauji Cereals
 Foundation Gas
 Overseas Employment Services
 Fauji Foundation Experimental And Seed Multiplication Farm

Subsidiaries
 Fauji Fertilizer Company Limited
 Fauji Fertilizer Bin Qasim Limited (FJFC),
 Fauji Cement Company Limited
 FFBL Power Company Limited (Fauji Power Company Ltd) FPCL.
 Fauji Kabirwali Power Company Limited
 Foundation Power Company Daharki Limited
 Mari Petroleum Company Limited
 Fauji Institute of Technology
 Fauji Akbar Portia Marine Terminal Limited
Fauji Retirement Home
 Fauji Oil Terminal And Distribution Company Limited
 Pakistan Maroc Phosphore, S.A., Morocco
 Foundation Securities (Pvt) Limited
 Askari Bank Limited
 Fauji Meat Limited
 Fauji Fresh n Squeeze
 FFC Energy Limited
 Fauji Foods Limited 
 Fauji Security Services
 Foundation Wind Energy - I
 Foundation Solar Energy (Pvt.) Ltd. 
 Foundation Wind Energy - II

Health care hospitals 
The Fauji Foundation medical system began with the establishment of a 50-bed TB hospital in 1959 at Rawalpindi. Today, the Fauji Foundation medical system is the largest medical chain outside the Government sector, spread all over Pakistan.
       		
On health care, Fauji Foundation spends over 58% of the welfare budget. Fauji Foundation Hospital Rawalpindi and Fauji Foundation Hospital Lahore are well funded hospitals of Fauji Foundation. It is run by former officers of Pakistani Armed Forces.

Education system 

With over 100 branches spread from Karachi to Gilgit having approx 45,000 students, 2000 teachers and over 1100 administrative staff, the Fauji Foundation Education system is amongst the largest education systems in the country. The Fauji Foundation's education system aims to provide education to the children of ex- armed forces personnel, as well as to civilians.

The headquarters of Fauji Foundation is in Rawalpindi, Pakistan. FFES is affiliated with the Federal Board of Intermediate and Secondary Education (FBISE), Islamabad. There are 102 schools (FF model schools) in Pakistan. The Fauji Foundation Colleges For Boys and Girls are located in New Lalazar, Rawalpindi.

Foundation University Medical College, Rawalpindi
Foundation University, Islamabad
Fauji Foundation College, Rawalpindi

See also 
List of largest companies in Pakistan
Army Welfare Trust
Bahria Foundation
Shaheen Foundation
Defence Housing Authority

References

External links

 
Conglomerate companies of Pakistan
1954 establishments in Pakistan
Conglomerate companies established in 1954
Companies based in Rawalpindi